The 1922 Western State Normal Hilltoppers football team was an American football team that represented Western State Normal School (later renamed Western Michigan University) during the 1922 college football season. William H. Spaulding left as the team's head coach after the 1921 season and was replaced by Milton Olander, who had played college football under Robert Zuppke at Illinois.  In their first season under Olander, the Hilltoppers compiled a perfect 6–0 record, shut out every opponent, and outscored opponents by a combined total of 160 to 0.

Schedule

References

Western State Normal
Western Michigan Broncos football seasons
College football undefeated seasons
Western State Normal Hilltoppers football